Baroda House was the residence of the Maharaja of Baroda in Delhi. It is located on Kasturba Gandhi Marg, next to Faridkot House.

History 
It was designed by the architect of New Delhi, Sir Edwin Lutyens. He designed the house on a train and it took 15 years to complete in 1936. Presently it is being used as the Zonal Headquarters Office of Northern Railways.

See also 
 Hyderabad House
 Bikaner House
 Jaipur House
 Patiala House

References

Further reading 
 

Royal residences in Delhi
Works of Edwin Lutyens in India
Baroda State